Liu Yongtan (born 1 December 1936) is a Chinese electrical engineer. He is a radar technology and signal processing expert. He is a member of the Chinese Academy of Sciences and Chinese Academy of Engineering.

Biography
Liu was born in Nanjing, Jiangsu, on December 1, 1936, while his ancestral home is in Wuhan, Hubei.

In 1953 he was accepted to the Harbin Institute of Technology, and three years later he entered Tsinghua University. After university, he was assigned to the Harbin Institute of Technology, where he was promoted to associate professor in 1978 and to full Professor in 1985. In June 1979 he pursued advanced studies at the University of Birmingham and University of Essex in the United Kingdom, where he studied radar technology under Sherman.

Liu was elected an academician of the Chinese Academy of Sciences in November 1991 and an academician of the Chinese Academy of Engineering in 1994.

On January 8, 2019, he was honored with the 2018 Highest Science and Technology Award, China's highest scientific award, at the Great Hall of the People in Beijing.

Personal life
Liu loves to listen to Ludwig van Beethoven's music.

Awards
 1991 First Prize of the National Science and Technology Progress Award
 2000 Science and Technology Award of the Ho Leung Ho Lee Foundation
 2015 First Prize of the National Science and Technology Progress Award
 2019 Highest Science and Technology Award

References

1936 births
Living people
Alumni of the University of Birmingham
Alumni of the University of Essex
Chinese electrical engineers
Engineers from Jiangsu
Harbin Institute of Technology alumni
Members of the Chinese Academy of Engineering
Members of the Chinese Academy of Sciences
People from Nanjing
Tsinghua University alumni